The de Havilland DH.65 Hound was a 1920s British two-seat day bomber built by de Havilland at Stag Lane Aerodrome.

History
The Hound was designed as a two-seat general purpose biplane, a private venture to meet Air Ministry Specification 12/26. The prototype G-EBNJ first flew on 17 November 1926. It was of all-wooden construction, powered by a Napier Lion engine. In 1927, the nose and rudder were modified, it was fitted with a geared engine and received the modified designation DH.65A. It was delivered to the Royal Air Force in January 1928 receiving serial number J9127 for evaluation. While it showed superior performance to the other competitors for the specification, it was rejected because of its wooden construction and the order was placed with the Hawker Hart.

Despite its rejection by the RAF, on 26 April 1928 the aircraft set a world record for carrying a load of 2,205 lb (1,000 kg) over 62 mi (100 km) at 160 mph (257 km/h) piloted by H.S. Broad.

A project to further develop the Hound as a four-seat passenger transport under the designation DH.74 was left unrealised.

The design being otherwise unsuccessful, the second aircraft G-EBNK was not completed.

Operators

Royal Air Force

Specifications (DH.65A)

See also

References

Hound
Biplanes
Single-engined tractor aircraft
1920s British bomber aircraft
Aircraft first flown in 1926